The National Movement of Afghanistan (Hezb-e-Nuhzhat-e-Mili Afghanistan) is a political party in Afghanistan. 
The size of the party is not available yet, since parliamentary elections were held on a non-partisan basis.

Political parties in Afghanistan